The 1938 South Sydney Rabbitohs season was the 31st in the club's history. The club competed in the New South Wales Rugby Football League Premiership (NSWRFL), finishing the season 2nd.

Ladder

Fixtures

Regular season

Finals

Player statistics

References 

1938 in Australian rugby league
South Sydney Rabbitohs seasons